Hajji Bala Beyglu (also Romanized as Ḩājjī Bālā Beyglū; also known as Bal and Bel) is a village in Anjirlu Rural District, in the Central District of Bileh Savar County, Ardabil Province, Iran. At the 2006 census, its population was 173, in 42 families.

References 

Towns and villages in Bileh Savar County